Cheriyo Holman is a 2002 Sri Lankan Sinhala comedy horror film directed by Parakrama Jayasinghe and co-produced by Raj Ranasinghe and Thilak Atapattu. It is the fourth and last film of Cheriyo film series, which is sequel to Cheriyo Darling. It stars Bandu Samarasinghe, Dilhani Ekanayake and Ananda Wickramage. Music for the film is done by Somapala Rathnayake. It is the 979th Sri Lankan film in the Sinhala cinema.

Plot
The film is set in a hotel. Many people visit the hotel and reserve their rooms. Meanwhile, the hotel is haunted by a ghost, "Mohini" (Dilhani) and all people are afraid of her horror incidents. Further information about the ghost is exhibited in the last part of the film. Until that moment, the film revolves around comedic incidents as well as hotel workers flirting with a beautiful girl, later known as the ghost.

Cast
 Bandu Samarasinghe
 Dilhani Ekanayake
 Ananda Wickramage
 Manel Wanaguru
 Susila Kottage
 Teddy Vidyalankara
 Janesh Silva
 Chathura Perera
 Upali Keerthisena

References

2002 films
2000s Sinhala-language films
2002 comedy films
Sri Lankan comedy films